Miracles is the second studio album by the Italian/U.S. ensemble Change. It was released in 1981 and reached number forty-six on the US Billboard Album Chart and nine on the US Billboard Black Albums chart. Miracles includes the singles "Paradise", "Your Move", "Heaven of My Life", "Stop for Love" (in the UK only) and "Miracles".

The band recorded the songs for album at Fonoprint Studios in Bologna, Italy. The songs were then taken to Mediasound Studios in New York City for the recording of the vocals. The sessions were mastered at Sterling Sound Studios. Receiving positive reviews, the album was originally released as an LP in March 1981. The artwork was designed by Greg Porto.

Reception

Miracles received positive reviews from the majority of critics.

Track listing

Personnel
Change
 James "Crab" Robinson - lead vocals
 Diva Gray - lead vocals, solo vocals, background vocals
 Paolo Gianolio - guitar
 Doc Powell - guitar
 David Romani - bass guitar
 Rudy Trevisi - saxophone
 Onaje Allan Grumbs - keyboards
 Maurizio Biancani - assistant synthesizer
 Terry Silverlight - drums
 Jocelyn Shaw, Luther Vandross, Krystal Davis, Dennis Collins  - background vocals

Additional musicians
 Mauro Malavasi - piano, synthesizer
 Victor Paz - trumpet
 Earl Gardiner - trumpet
 Denny Trimboli - saxophone
 Bob Alexander - trombone
 The Goody Music String Ensemble - strings
 Gordon Grody - solo vocals
 Ullanda McCullough, Fonzi Thornton, Benny Diggs - background vocals

Technical
 Jacques Fred Petrus and Mauro Malavasi - producer, executive producer (for Little Macho Music Co., Inc., New York)
 David Romani, Mauro Malavasi and Paolo Gianolio - composing, arrangements, conducting
 Tanyayette Willoughby - vocal conducting
 Jocelyn Shaw - vocal conducting, lyrics
 Paul Slade - lyrics
 Maurizio Biancani - engineering (Fonoprint Studios)
 Michael H. Brauer - engineering (Fonoprint and Mediasound Studios)
 Andy Hoffman - assistant engineer (Mediasound Studios)
 Greg Calbi - engineer (Sterling Sound)
 Greg Porto - art and design

Charts

Sampling
 French house duo Le Knight Club sampled parts of this song for their two songs, "Hysteria" and "Hysteria II"
 The elements of this song was sampled by VANTAGE //, Who made the track "Happiness Deluxe" from the 'Metro City' album.
 House Producer Les Années Folles sampled parts for his song 'Yacht'
 Shook sampled elements of "Hold Tight" for his single, "Hold Tight" from his EP, "The Rise and Fall EP" released in 2011

References

1981 albums
Change (band) albums
Atlantic Records albums